Hemşo is a 2000 Turkish film directed and written by Ömer Uğur.

Cast
Okan Bayülgen as Cebrail 
Mehmet Ali Erbil as Yaşar 
Demet Şener as Tatyana 
Sümer Tilmaç as Hamit 
Özlem Yıldız as Mariana 
Oya Aydoğan   
Yaşar Güner as The landlord 
Yıldız Kaplan   
Levent Kazak   
Yılmaz Köksal   
Cengiz Küçükayvaz   
Dilaver Uyanık as Cebrail's grandfather

External links 

Turkish comedy-drama films
Films set in Turkey
2000 films
2000s Turkish-language films
2000s buddy films